Manuel Abreu-Castillo was a lawyer who, as the youngest President of the Puerto Rico Bar Association led a delegation of 11 lawyers from Puerto Rico who joined the August 1963 March on Washington for Jobs and Freedom, at which Martin Luther King Jr. gave his famous "I Have a Dream" speech.

During Abreu's term as Bar president, he was active in the Interamerican Lawyers Federation and served as the organization's liaison with Dr. Arturo Morales Carrión, at the time the Assistant Deputy Secretary of State for Latin American Affairs at the United States State Department. He also fought to guarantee the fiscal autonomy of Puerto Rico's Judicial Branch.

References

Puerto Rican lawyers